, also known , is a Japanese voice actress from Kitami, Hokkaido, Japan. She was affiliated with Production Ace Engi Kenkyuujo and graduated from Yoyogi Animation Gakuin. Kitaoka made her voice acting debut in Kiddy Girl-and (2009) under the stage name Aya Gouda. She went on to use that name until she left the Production Ace agency in September 2012.

Filmography

Anime
2009
Kiddy Girl-and as Q-feuille
2010
Sora no Otoshimono: Forte as Chika Yanagisawa (eps 6, 9, 11–12), Girl (eps 4–5), Radio (ep 10)
2011
A Dark Rabbit Has Seven Lives as Saeko Suzae
Kore wa Zombie Desu ka? as Sarasvati / Kirara Hoshikawa, Female student (ep 6)
Maken-ki! as Furan Takaki
R-15 as Taketo Akutagawa
2012
Kore wa Zombie Desu ka? of the Dead as Sarasvati / Kirara Hoshikawa
Recorder and Randsell as Takumi
2014
Atelier Escha & Logy: Alchemists of the Dusk Sky as Threia Hazelgrimm
Robot Girls Z as DanDan

ONA/OVA
2011
Toei Robot Girls as Dan Dan / Danguard Ace
2012
Upotte!! as Ichihachi (AR18)

References

External links
 
 Official Blog
 

1988 births
Japanese voice actresses
Living people
People from Kitami, Hokkaido